Avaypara is a village at Kachua Upazila in Chandpur District in the Chittagong Division of central-eastern Bangladesh. It is a village of the Bitara union. All villagers are Muslim. There's a government primary school in this village.  There are 6 mosques in here. The River Khirai flows the south of the village. The Ghugra Bill is the north of the village. In the east is Shankerpur and Bitara is in the west.

References

Villages in Chandpur District
Villages in Chittagong Division